"Now Or Never" is the debut single by British singer-songwriter Jodie Connor, which features vocals from British grime artist Wiley. It was released by digital download on 13 January 2011 on Polydor Records. The track was produced by Takeover Entertainment producer David Dawood, who also produced Roll Deep's number one single "Good Times" on which Connor is featured.

Critical reception
Robert Copsey of Digital Spy gave the song a positive review stating:

They say breaking into the music industry takes a combination of talent, persistence and a cheeky wink from good old Lady Luck. This tried and tested formula could certainly be applied to Jodie Connor, who was given a shot at the bigtime back in the heady days of April 2010 when she trilled the hook on Roll Deep's chart-topping smash 'Good Times'.

By way of a thank you, we're assuming, she's teamed up with the rap pack's head honcho Wiley for her first dip into solodom, offering up a neat little grime-pop ditty about playground love which marries a twinkly piano riff to gritty blips and bleeps in perfectly listenable fashion. The lyrics are hardly Ivor Novello-worthy stuff - even rhyming "now or never" with "together" and "stormy weather" - but what would you expect from the woman who crooned one of the most cliche-laden choruses of last year?"I'm gonna leave the day behind..." .

Chart performance
"Now or Never" debuted on the UK Singles Chart at number 14 on 23 January 2011 as the week's fifth highest entry. The single also managed to debut at number 6 on the R&B chart. On its second week in the chart, the single fell 16 places to number 30; being hailed the week's Biggest Faller. It then fell 18 places to number 48 and in its fourth week dropped to #100.

Track listings and formats

Charts

References

2011 singles
Jodie Connor songs
Wiley (musician) songs
Songs written by Jodie Connor
Songs written by David Dawood
Song recordings produced by David Dawood
Takeover Entertainment singles